Arena station may refer to:

 Arena station (Buffalo Metro Rail), a light rail station in Buffalo, New York, renamed Special Events station
 Arena station (UTA), a light rail station in Salt Lake City, Utah
 Amalie Arena station, a streetcar stop in Tampa, Florida
 Amsterdam Bijlmer ArenA station, a railway, metro and bus station in Amsterdam, Netherlands
 Baltimore Arena (University Center) station, a light rail station in Baltimore, Maryland
 Coventry Arena railway station, a railway station in Coventry, England
 Dome/GWCC/Philips Arena/CNN Center station, a metro station in Atlanta, Georgia
 Joe Louis Arena station, a People Mover station in Detroit, Michigan
 Kaohsiung Arena MRT station, a metro station in Kaohsiung, Taiwan
 Metro Ferrería/Arena Ciudad de México, a metro station in Azcapotzalco, Mexico City
 Taipei Arena MRT station, a metro station in Taipei, Taiwan
 Crossharbour DLR station, a light rail station in London, England, that was named Crossharbour and London Arena station from 1994 to 2006
 Charlotte Transportation Center, an intermodal transit station in Charlotte, North Carolina, also known as Arena station or CTC/Arena station

See also
Stadium station (disambiguation)